Benton is a city in Ringgold County, Iowa, United States. The population was 39 at the 2020 census.

Geography
Benton is located at  (40.705785, -94.357796).

Demographics

2010 census
As of the census of 2010, there were 41 people, 18 households, and 13 families living in the city. The racial makeup of the city was 95.1% White, 2.4% from other races, and 2.4% from two or more races. Hispanic or Latino of any race were 4.9% of the population.

There were 18 households, of which 16.7% had children under the age of 18 living with them, 72.2% were married couples living together, and 27.8% were non-families. 16.7% of all households were made up of individuals. The average household size was 2.28 and the average family size was 2.62.

The median age in the city was 53.5 years. 12.2% of residents were under the age of 18; 9.7% were between the ages of 18 and 24; 9.7% were from 25 to 44; 48.9% were from 45 to 64; and 19.5% were 65 years of age or older. The gender makeup of the city was 58.5% male and 41.5% female.

2000 census
As of the census of 2000, there were 40 people, 19 households, and 14 families living in the city. The racial makeup of the city was 100.00% White. Hispanic or Latino of any race were 2.50% of the population.

There were 19 households, out of which 10.5% had children under the age of 18 living with them, 68.4% were married couples living together, and 26.3% were non-families. 26.3% of all households were made up of individuals, and 10.5% had someone living alone who was 65 years of age or older. The average household size was 2.11 and the average family size was 2.43.

In the city, the population was spread out, with 10.0% under the age of 18, 7.5% from 18 to 24, 22.5% from 25 to 44, 32.5% from 45 to 64, and 27.5% who were 65 years of age or older. The median age was 52 years. For every 100 females, there were 166.7 males. For every 100 females age 18 and over, there were 140.0 males.

The median income for a household in the city was $26,250, and the median income for a family was $29,375. Males had a median income of $16,875 versus $16,250 for females. The per capita income for the city was $15,752. None of the population and none of the families were below the poverty line.

Education
Mount Ayr Community School District operates public schools serving the community.

References

Cities in Iowa
Cities in Ringgold County, Iowa